Mair may refer to:

People
 Mair (surname)
Mair von Landshut, late 15th-century German engraver.
 Welsh given name (pronounced ) meaning Mary

Other uses
 Mair, Egypt
 Mair caste, a Punjab tribe
 the Mers or Mairs, an ethnic group in Western India
 MAIR Holdings, an airline holding company based in Minnesota, United States

See also 
 Jacob Le Maire, a Dutch mariner

Scottish words and phrases
Welsh feminine given names